Year 1375 (MCCCLXXV) was a common year starting on Monday (link will display the full calendar) of the Julian calendar.

Events 
 January–December 
 April 14 – The Mamluks from Egypt complete their conquest of the Armenian Kingdom of Cilicia. Levon V Lusignan of Armenia is imprisoned for several years in Cairo, until a ransom is paid by King John I of Castile.
 April 21 – Mujahid Shah succeeds his father, Mohammed Shah I, as ruler of the Bahmani Sultanate in the Deccan Plateau of southern India.
 June 18 – The future King John I of Castile marries Eleanor of Aragon.
 June 27 – Hundred Years' War: The English, weakened by the plague, lose so much ground to the French that they agree to sign the Treaty of Bruges, leaving them with only the coastal towns of Calais, Bordeaux and Bayonne.
 October 24 – Margaret I of Denmark becomes Regent of Denmark after the death of her father, Valdemar IV.

 Date unknown 
 The Grand Duchy of Moscow and Tver sign a truce. Tver agrees to help Moscow fight the Blue Horde.
 Presumed death of Tenoch, ruler of the Mexica; he is succeeded by Acamapichtli who becomes first tlatoani (ruler) of the Aztecs of Tenochtitlan and founder of the Aztec imperial dynasty.
 Petru succeeds as Voivode (ruler) of Moldavia (modern-day Moldova & eastern Romania). He is the first ruler from the dynastic House of Bogdan.
 Coluccio Salutati is appointed Chancellor of Florence.
 The Russian town of Kostroma is destroyed by the ushkuynik pirates from Novgorod.
 Heirin-ji Temple is founded near Tokyo.
 In Nanjing, capital of Ming dynasty China, a bureau secretary of the Ministry of Justice, Ru Taisu, sends a 17,000 character-long memorial to the throne, to be read aloud to the Hongwu Emperor. By the 16,370th character, the emperor has been offended by several passages, and has Ru Taisu summoned to court and flogged for the perceived insult. The next day, having had the remaining characters read to him, he likes four of Ru's recommendations, and instates these in reforms. Ru is nevertheless castigated for having forced the emperor to hear thousands of characters before getting to the part with true substance. The last 500 characters are elevated in court as the model-type memorial that all officials should aspire to create while writing their own.
 Approximate date – Battle of Gardiki: The Principality of Achaea defeats the Despotate of the Morea.

Births 
 October – Joanna of Aragon, Countess of Foix, Aragonese throne claimant (d. 1407)
 date unknown
 Richard of Conisburgh, 3rd Earl of Cambridge (approximate date; d. 1415)
 Nicolas Grenon, French composer (approximate date; d. 1456)
 Lan Kham Deng, King of Lan Xang 1416–1428 (d. 1428)
 Johannes Abezier (1375–1424), Roman Catholic religious and political leader of the Teutonic Knights, over Polish territory

Deaths 
 April 21 – Elisabeth of Meissen, Burgravine consort of Nuremberg (b. 1329)
 October 19 – Cansignorio della Scala, Lord of Verona (b. 1340)
 April 16 – John Hastings, 2nd Earl of Pembroke, English nobleman and soldier (b. 1347)
 May 16 – Liu Bowen, Chinese military strategist, officer, statesman and poet (b. 1311)
 July 5 – Charles III of Alençon, French archbishop (b. 1337)
 September 1 – Philip of Valois, Duke of Orléans (b. 1336)
 October 24 – King Valdemar IV of Denmark
 November 12 – John Henry, Margrave of Moravia (b. 1322)
 December 21 – Giovanni Boccaccio, Italian writer (b. 1313)
 date unknown
 Adityawarman, king of Malayapura
 Margaret Drummond, dowager queen consort of Scotland (b. c.1340)
 Lațcu, voivode of Moldavia
 Tenoch, Mexica ruler

References